"Luftfartsverket" is also the former Swedish name for the Finnish air navigation service provider, Finavia
The Swedish Civil Aviation Administration is a Swedish Government agency which regulated and oversaw all aspects of aviation in Sweden until 2005. The regulatory division was called Luftfartsstyrelsen.

The Air Navigation Service Provider (ANSP) (Flygtrafiktjänsten) was established as Luftfartsverket (LFV). The agency had its head office in Norrköping.

In 2005 the regulatory division was separated to a new agency named Luftfartsstyrelsen, from 2009 part of Transportstyrelsen.

On 1 April 2010, the airport ownership and operation part of the Luftfartsverket was transferred to Swedish Airports (Swedavia AB), a newly formed fully state-owned company.

Air navigation services continue as a state enterprise under the name LFV.

See also 

Air traffic control
List of Swedish government enterprises
List of airports in Sweden
List of airports

References

External links 

Civil Aviation Administration (Archive) (2005)
Civil Aviation Administration (Archive) (2000–2004)
Civil Aviation Administration (Archive) (1998–2000)
Civil Aviation Administration (Archive) 

Civil Aviation
Civil Aviation Administration
Air navigation service providers